The Jimmy Stewart Show is an American situation comedy starring James Stewart as a college professor in a small town who shares his home with three generations of his family. Twenty-four episodes of the show were broadcast during the 1971–1972 season on NBC.

Synopsis 
Dr. James K. Howard, known as Jim, is an anthropology professor at Josiah Kessel College, the small-town institution of higher learning founded by his grandfather Josiah Kessel in the fictional town of Easy Valley in Northern California. Jim — whose middle name is Kessel — lives with his wife of 30 years, Martha, and their eight-year-old son Teddy. Jim also has a 29-year-old son, Peter J. Howard, Sr., known as "P.J.," who owns the Easy Valley Construction Company, where his pretty and perky wife Wendy assists him. P.J. and Wendy also have an eight-year-old son, Peter J. "Jake" Howard, Jr., who is Teddy's nephew but finds it strange to refer to Teddy as his uncle; the two boys often bicker over what to call one another and who should show greater respect to whom. Jim's easygoing life becomes complicated when he inadvertently burns down P.J. and Wendy's house and he and Martha invite P.J., Wendy, and Jake to move in with them temporarily. Jim is good-natured, and the two families do the best they can to get along in the overcrowded house, but conflicts are inevitable.

Dr. Luther Quince, a Nobel Prize-winning chemistry professor, is a faculty colleague of Jim's at the college and quite a contrast to Jim — Luther drives a Rolls-Royce while Jim rides a bicycle to class, and Luther thinks of himself as having refined tastes, while Jim plays the accordion. Nonetheless, the two men are good friends. One of Martha's projects is a portrait of Luther, which she has been painting for a long time but never seems to finish. Woodrow Yamada is the Howards' talkative milkman.

In the show's opening credits, Stewart (as Professor Howard) bicycles through the community. Stewart speaks directly to the camera and out of character at the beginning of each episode, introducing himself as "Jim Stewart" and telling the audience the title of the episode. At the end of each episode, he again speaks to the viewers, expressing the hope that they will return for the following week's show and wishing them "peace and love and laughter". In some episodes, he speaks to the viewers at other times as well, in character as Jim Howard, with any other actors in the scene behaving as if Jim is talking to himself.

Episodes occasionally include flashbacks depicting Jim Howard's grandfather, Josiah Kessel. In these flashbacks, Stewart portrays Kessel and Stewart's real-life wife, Gloria Stewart, plays Kessel's wife.

Cast
 Jimmy Stewart as Professor James K. Howard and Josiah Kessel
 Julie Adams as  Martha Howard
 Jonathan Daly as Peter J. "P.J." Howard, Sr.
 Ellen Geer as Wendy Howard
 Dennis Larson as Teddy Howard
 Kirby Furlong as Peter J. "Jake" Howard, Jr.
 John McGiver as Dr. Luther Quince
 Jack Soo as Woodrow Yamada

Production
The show is notable as the only television or film production in which Stewart allowed himself to be billed onscreen as "Jimmy".  In all of his movies, he was billed as "James Stewart" (although he also used "Jimmy" for his book Jimmy Stewart and His Poems).

The Jimmy Stewart Show had no laugh track. Procter & Gamble sponsored the show.

In the episode "The Identity Crisis," Beulah Bondi portrayed James Stewart's mother. She also played his mother in four films: It's a Wonderful Life, Mr. Smith Goes to Washington, Of Human Hearts, and Vivacious Lady.

According to series producer Hal Kanter, Stewart had African American actor Hal Williams dismissed from a guest appearance in one episode (in which Williams' character was to confront Stewart's) on racial grounds.

Reception

The show fared poorly critically, was also a ratings disappointment and was cancelled after only one season. It finished 44th out of 78 shows that season with a 17.7 rating.

Broadcast history

The Jimmy Stewart Show premiered on September 19, 1971. Its 24th and last original episode was broadcast on March 12, 1972. Reruns of the show then aired in its regular time slot until August 27, 1972. It was broadcast on NBC on Sundays from 8:30 to 9:00 p.m. Eastern Time throughout its run.

Episodes
SOURCES:

Home release
On January 21, 2014, Warner Home Video released The Jimmy Stewart Show: The Complete Series on DVD in Region 1, via their Warner Archive Collection. This is a manufacture-on-demand (MOD) release, available via WBShop.com and Amazon.com.

References

External links
 
 The Jimmy Stewart Show opening credits on YouTube
 The Jimmy Stewart Show opening and closing credits (from the episode "Old School Ties") on YouTube
 Scenes from The Jimmy Stewart Show episode "By Way of Introduction" on YouTube
 Opening scenes from The Jimmy Stewart Show episode "The Identity Crisis" on YouTube
 Excerpt from The Jimmy Stewart Show episode "Pro Bono Publico" on YouTube

1971 American television series debuts
1972 American television series endings
1970s American college television series
1970s American sitcoms
English-language television shows
NBC original programming
Television series about families
Television series by Warner Bros. Television Studios
Television shows set in California